Methdilazine (Dilosyn, Tacaryl) is a first-generation antihistamine with anticholinergic properties of the phenothiazine class.

Synthesis

See also 
 Phenothiazine

References 

 
 
 

The ring-contracted analog, methdilazine shows only very weak activity as a tranquilizer; instead, that agent constitutes an important antihistamine.

Phenothiazines
Pyrrolidines
H1 receptor antagonists